A Glen Campbell Christmas is the fifty-sixth album by American singer/guitarist Glen Campbell, released in 1998 on the TNN Classic Sessions label (see 1998 in music). In 1999 the album was repackaged and released on the Unison/TNN label.

Track listing

 "The First Noel" (traditional)  – 2:32
 "O Little Town of Bethlehem" (traditional)  – 2:29
 "God Rest Ye Merry Gentlemen" (traditional)  – 2:41
 "Silent Night" (traditional)  – 2:30
 "Hark the Herald Angels Sing" (traditional)  – 3:07
 "Away In A Manger" (traditional)  – 3:00
 "What Child Is This" (traditional)  – 3:30
 "O Come All Ye Faithful" (traditional)  – 2:18
 "It Came Upon a Midnight Clear" (traditional)  – 3:15
 "O Holy Night" (traditional)  – 3:56
 "Joy to the World" (traditional) – 2:33

Personnel
Eddie Bayers – percussion
Dennis Burnside – keyboards
Michael Rhodes – bass guitar
Brent Rowan – electric guitar
Background vocals – the Belmont University Choir, directed by Tim Sharp

Production
Executive producer – Martin Clayton, Brian Hughes, Paul Corbin
Producer – Barry Beckett, Eddie Bayers
Arranger – Dennis Burnside
Engineer – Pete Green
Second engineer – David Boyer
Liner notes – Michael Gray
Project coordinator – Kate Haggerty
Art direction – Biz Woodie
Design – Alter Ego Design
Photography – Jim Hagans

Awards
The album won a Dove Award for Best Country Album in 1999. The album was also nominated for a Grammy for Best Southern, Country of Bluegrass Gospel Album.

References

1998 Christmas albums
Christmas albums by American artists
Glen Campbell albums
Country Christmas albums